A Christmas to Remember is a 1978 American made-for-television drama film directed by George Englund and starring Jason Robards, Eva Marie Saint, and Joanne Woodward. Adapted from the 1977 novel The Melodeon by Glendon Swarthout, it first aired on the CBS network on December 20, 1978.  It was filmed in Rush City, Minnesota.

Plot
Rusty McCloud (George Parry) is sent by his economically-strapped mother (Joanne Woodward) to live on his grandparents' farm one winter during the Great Depression. The grandparents, Daniel Larson (Jason Robards) and his wife Emma (Saint), are still grieving the loss of their son in World War I, and Daniel in particular is initially gruff and resentful toward his grandson. However, a bond gradually develops between the two of them, and as Christmas approaches they work to deliver a melodeon left by the dead son to the local church as a surprise gift.

Cast
Jason Robards as Daniel Larson
Eva Marie Saint as Emma Larson
Joanne Woodward as Mildred McCloud
George Parry as Rusty McCloud
Bryan Englund as Danny Larson
Mary-Beth Manning as Louise Hockmeyer
Nora Martin as Lollie Hockmeyer
Sally Chamberlain as Lil Hockmeyer
Arvid Carlson as Ralph Youngquist
Mildred Carlson as Beulah Youngquist
Allen Hamilton as Oskar Hockmeyer
Todd Tanji as the cymbal player
Dave Tanji and Bob Bach as snare drummers

See also 
 List of Christmas films

References

External links

1978 television films
1978 films
1970s Christmas drama films
1970s Christmas films
American Christmas drama films
CBS network films
Christmas television films
Films based on American novels
Films directed by George Englund
Films scored by Jimmie Haskell
Films set in Minnesota
Films shot in Minnesota
Films with screenplays by Stewart Stern
Great Depression films
American drama television films
1970s English-language films
1970s American films